The Hutaym (also Hutaim, Huteim) are a tribe of northwestern Arabia. Traditionally, they are considered a pariah group by the Arabs and their name has been used as a catch-all term covering other pariah groups as well, such as the Jibāliyya of the Sinai. Many groups labelled Hutaym call themselves Rashāyida .

Hutaym (plural Hitmān) is sometimes incorrectly spelled Ḥutaym or al-Hutaym. The standard pronunciation in Peninsular Arabic is ihtēm. It comes from the adjective ahtam and means "a man whose two front teeth are broken
off at the root", that is, one who cannot trace his ancestry. A member of the tribe is called a Hutaymī. The main sections of the tribe are Āl Barrāk, Āl Qalādān, Āl Shumaylān, Maẓābira, Nawāmisa and Fuhayqāt. The head of Āl Barrāk is traditionally chief of the whole tribe.

There is little reliable information on the origins of the Hutaym, which is consistent with the name's being a derogatory term applied by outsiders to socially low-ranking groups. The Arab tribes regard them as neither Qaḥṭānite nor ʿAdnānite and thus not true Arabs by descent, and refuse to intermarry with them. One story, however, attributes their pariah status to an act of incest by the eponymous ancestor Hutaym, who was presumably an Arab. Another account makes them descendants of the Banū Hilāl. James Raymond Wellsted, who visited them in the early 1830s, speculated that they were the Ichthyophagi mentioned by classical authors.

The Hutaym regard themselves as kin of another pariah group, the Sharārāt. Both groups breed dromedaries and are thus more respected than the Ṣulayb, a pariah group that breeds donkeys. They are regarded as superior hunters to the Bedouins (noble Arab nomads), but inferior to the Ṣulayb. They also raise sheep and goats. The Hutaym of the coast are fishers.

The Hutaym live mainly around Khaybar and the Ḥarrat Khaybar lava field has also been called the Ḥarrat Hutaym. They also live in the Nafūd and the oasis al-Mustajidda and have migrated into the Tihāma to the south. Groups labelled Hutaymī are also found in Egypt, Sudan and the islands of the Red Sea, although it is not clear whether these groups are actually related to peninsular Hutaym. The Hutaymī camel traders of Kassala have intermarried with the Beja.

The term Hutaym first appears in Arabic literature around 1200, then again in Ottoman tax records of the early 16th century. They were one of the five tribes of the sanjak of Gaza who paid tribute to the sultan. A record of 1553 states they habitually raided the sanjak of Ajlun and had to be put down. By the 19th century, as recorded by several European travellers, the term being used to describe a low caste and not a specific tribe. The English poet Charles Montagu Doughty travelled through Hutaymī territory in 1877–1878 and wrote about his experience in Travels in Arabia Deserta. He considered them more robust than the Bedouins but less dignified. The British Admiralty's Handbook of Arabia, written for the Arab Revolt during World War I in 1916, denigrated them as soldiers but admitted that they openly resisted the Rashīdī Emirate (Britain's adversary) and even raided the outskirts of the Rashīdī capital, Ḥāʾil.

References

Ethnic groups in Saudi Arabia
Ethnic groups in the Middle East
Ethnic groups in Sudan
Red Sea